The Bermuda national under-20 football team represents Bermuda in international football at this age level and is controlled by the Bermuda Football Association.

See also

Bermuda national football team

References

u20
Bermuda